Kay Khosrow is a legendary king of Iran of Kayanian dynasty and a character in the Persian epic book, Shahnameh. He was the son of the Iranian prince Siavash who married princess Farangis of Turan while in exile. Before Kay Khosrow was born, his father was murdered in Turan by his maternal grandfather Afrasiab. Kay Khosrow was trained as a child in the desert by Piran, the wise vizier of Afrasiab. His paternal grandfather was Kay Kāvus, the legendary Shah of Iran who chose him as his heir when he returned to Iran with his mother. The name Kay Khosrow derives from Avestan 𐬐𐬀𐬎𐬎𐬌 𐬵𐬀𐬊𐬯𐬭𐬀𐬎𐬎𐬀𐬢𐬵𐬀  Kauui Haosrauuaŋha, meaning "seer/poet who has good fame".

In Avesta
In Avesta, Kay Khosrow has the epithet of 𐬀𐬭𐬱𐬀 𐬀𐬌𐬭𐬌𐬌𐬀𐬥𐬄𐬨 𐬛𐬀𐬒  𐬌𐬌𐬎𐬥𐬄𐬨 "arša airiianąm dax́ iiunąm", meaning "stallion of the Aryan lands". According to Avesta, Kay Khosrow had a son called Āxrūra. Kay Khosrow sacrificed for Anahita in Lake Chichast for winning a chariot race. He killed Afrasiyab in  Lake Chichast as revenge for Siavash who had been killed by Aγraēraθa, son of Naru.

In Pahlavi texts
In Pahlavi texts, his name is mentioned as Kay Husrōy. According to Šahrestānīhā ī Ērānšahr, he was born in the city of Samarkand, a city founded by his paternal grandfather, Kay Kavus. Kay Khosrow founded the fire of Warahrān (Persian: Bahram) in the city of Samarkand, and reinstalled another fire by the name of Karkōy in the city of Zarang, which was extinguished. According to Menog-i Khrad, Kay Khosrow ruled over Iran for 60 years, and then handed the power to the Kay Luhrasp. Kay Khosrow destroyed an idol temple by the Lake Chichast, and at the resurrection, he will collaborate with Saoshyants.

In post-Islamic texts
Some Islamic era authors such as Hamza al-Isfahani and Ibn Balkhi considered him a prophet. He is the son of Siyavash and Farangis, and when his father was killed by Garsivaz, Kay Khosrow was entrusted by Piran Viseh to some shepherds. Afrasiyab constantly sees dreams and is worried about his kingship. He asks Piran to bring the child before him to test his cleverness in order to see if he can be a threat. Piran advises Kay Khosrow to answer all of the questions backward. Convinced that Khosrow is just an idiot, Afrasiyab orders Piran to send him to his mother who lives in the city of Siyavashgerd, which was founded by his father. Meanwhile, in Iran, Gudarz sees a dream, in which a Sorush tells about Kay Khosrow to him. Only Giv can bring the child back to Iran. After seven years of searching for Kay Khosrow, he finally finds him and brings him back together with his mother, Farangis.

Cup of Kay Khosrow

The Cup of Jamshid or, in reality, the Cup of Kay Khosrow (Cup of Djemscheed or Jaam-e Jam, or cup of Kay Khosrow in Persian: جام جم) is a cup of divination which, in Persian mythology, was long possessed by the rulers of ancient Persia. The cup has also been called Jam-e Jahan nama, Jam-e Jahan Ara, Jam-e Giti nama, and Jam-e Kay Khosrow. The latter refers to Kaei Husravah in the Avesta, and Sushravas in the Vedas.
This Cup was used just once and by Kay Khosrow in his reign to find where Bizhan was, who had gone to the Turan border for hunting. Bizhan had become romantically involved with Manizheh, the daughter of Turanian king Afrasiab, after a brief encounter with her in the border of Iran and Turan. Manizheh clandestinely brought him to the palace of her father, and when Afrasiab found out he threw Bizhan into a pit and expelled Manizheh from the castle. Everyone in Iran thought that Bizhan was dead except for Kay Khosrow who saw him alive in the Cup. Kay Khosrow then sent Rostam to rescue Bizhan.

The cup ("Jām") was said to be filled with an elixir of immortality and was used in scrying. As mentioned by Ali-Akbar Dehkhoda, it was believed that one could observe all the seven heavens of the universe by looking into it (از هفت فلک در او مشاهده و معاینه کردی). It was believed to have been discovered in Persepolis in ancient times. The whole world was said to be reflected in it, and divinations within the Cup were said to reveal deep truths. Sometimes, especially in popular depictions such as The Heroic Legend of Arslan, the cup is visualized as a crystal ball. Helen Zimmern's English translation of the Shahnameh uses the term "crystal globe".

See also
Davazdah Rokh
Kay Bahman
 Cyrus the Great

References

External links
 Sixty years Khosrow Kingdom in the Shanahmeh (in Persian)

Kayanians
Shahnameh characters